Anthony Wood (1923–1987) was a British school teacher and historian.

He was an expert on 19th and 20th century European history and was head of history at Winchester College. He was the author of the popular The Russian Revolution in the Seminar Studies in History series, which has not been out of print since it was first published in 1979.

Selected publications
Nineteenth Century Britain, 1815–1914. Longman, London, 1960. (Second edition 1982)
Europe, 1815–1945. Longman, London.
Europe, 1815–1960. Longman, London.
Great Britain, 1900–65. Longman, London, 1978.
The Russian Revolution. Longman, London, 1979. (Seminar Studies in History) (Second edition 1986)
War in Europe, 1939–45. Longman, London, 1987.

References 

1923 births
1987 deaths
Schoolteachers from Hampshire
20th-century British historians